"Ride of the Valkyries" is the popular term for the music of the beginning of act 3 of Richard Wagner's opera Die Walküre. 

Ride of the Valkyrie(s) may also refer to:

Ride of the Valkyrie (1967 film)
The Ride of the Valkyrs, a 1909 painting by John Charles Dollman
"Hard Drive Courage / The Ride of the Valkyries", an episode of Courage the Cowardly Dog

See also
 Flight of the Valkyries, an annual metal festival in the United States
 Valkyrie (disambiguation)